Lamastre is a commune in the Ardèche department in southern France. It lies on the river Doux. The Chemin de fer du Vivarais, a metre-gauge tourist railway, connects Lamastre with Tournon-sur-Rhône.

Population

See also
Communes of the Ardèche department

References

External links
Official site

Communes of Ardèche
Ardèche communes articles needing translation from French Wikipedia